David Graham Hutton OBE (13 April 1904 – 14 October 1988), was a British economist, writer and Liberal Party politician.

Background
Hutton was born the elder son of David and Lavinia Hutton. He was educated at Christ's Hospital, the London School of Economics and at French and German Universities. He married Magdalene Ruth Rudolph, of Zürich. In 1934 the marriage was dissolved. In 1940 he married Joyce Muriel Green. They had three daughters. In 1958 the marriage was dissolved. He then married Marjorie Bremner, of Chicago. In 1945 he was awarded the OBE. In 1971 he was made an Honorary Fellow at the London School of Economics.

Professional career
In 1929 Hutton became a Gladstone Memorial Prizeman at London University. He had a Research Fellowship and was on the teaching staff at the London School of Economics from 1929–33. In 1932 he became a Barrister-at-Law, at Gray’s Inn. From 1933 to 1938 he worked as assistant editor, for The Economist. From 1939 to 1945 he worked at the Foreign Office and the Ministry of Information. He was associated with the Unservile State Group. In 1955 he helped to establish the Institute of Economic Affairs.

Political career
Hutton was selected as Liberal candidate for the East Dorset for the General Election expected to occur in 1939/40. His prospects were good, particularly when the Labour candidate indicted he would withdraw and support Hutton as the Popular front candidate. However, due to the outbreak of war the election was deferred until 1945, when he did not stand. He did not subsequently stand for parliament.

Publications
Nations and the Economic Crisis, 1932 
The Burden of Plenty (as editor and contributor, 1935)
Is it Peace?, 1936
Danubian Destiny, 1939
Midwest at Noon, 1946
English Parish Churches, 1952
We Too Can Prosper, 1953
All Capitalists Now, 1960
Inflation and Society, 1960
Mexican Images, 1963
Planning and Enterprise, 1964
Politics and Economic Growth, 1968
English Parish Churches, 1976 (with Olive Cook) 
Whatever Happened to Productivity? (Wincott Lecture), 1980

References

1904 births
1988 deaths
Liberal Party (UK) parliamentary candidates
People educated at Christ's Hospital
Alumni of the London School of Economics
Members of Gray's Inn
The Economist people
Officers of the Order of the British Empire